Diego Rafael Padrón Sánchez (born 17 May 1939 in Montalbán) is the Archbishop of Cumaná. Sanchez is the president of the Venezuelan Episcopal Conference since 2012.

On 7 July 2017, he condemned what he say the brutal attacks against opposition deputies at the Venezuelan National Assembly a few days earlier.

External links

References

1939 births
Living people
20th-century Roman Catholic archbishops in Venezuela
Roman Catholic archbishops of Cumaná
Venezuelan Roman Catholic archbishops